is a Japanese ghost story and one of the most famous  in Japan. The plot involves sex with the dead and the consequences of loving a ghost.

History
 entered Japanese literary culture in the 17th century, through a translation of a book of Chinese ghost stories called  (New Tales Under the Lamplight) by Qu You. The collection was didactic in nature, containing Buddhist moral lessons on karma.

At the time, Japan's borders were entirely closed, with very little of the outside world known by its people; as such, China was viewed as a mysterious and exotic nation. Asai removed the Buddhist moral lessons and gave the stories a Japanese setting, placing  in the Nezu district of Tokyo.

In order to achieve a greater length, the story was fleshed out considerably, adding background information on several characters as well as additional subplots. It was then adapted to the kabuki stage in July 1892, and staged at the Kabukiza under the title .

In 1899, Lafcadio Hearn, with the help of a friend, translated  into English for his book In Ghostly Japan. He titled his adaptation A Passional Karma, and based it on the kabuki version of the story.

A more modern version of the play was written in 1974 by the playwright Onishi Nobuyuki for the Bungakuza troupe, starring Sugimura Haruko, Kitamura Kazuo and Ninomiya Sayoko. It was so successful that it was staged again a few years later in April 1976 at the Shimbashi Embujo. A new adaptation by Kawatake Shinshichi III was staged for the first time with a full kabuki casting in June 1989, again at the Shimbashi Embujo. The Kawatake version is still occasionally revived but is less popular than the Onishi one.

Much like , there remains a superstition that actors who play the ghost roles in  will come to harm. This comes from a 1919 performance at the Imperial Theater, when the two actresses playing Otsuyu and her maid became sick and died within a week of each other.

Story

version
Ogiwara is instantly smitten with the woman, named Otsuyu, and vows an eternal relationship. From that night onward, the woman and the girl visit at dusk, always leaving before dawn. An elderly neighbor, suspicious of the girl, peeks into his home and finds Ogiwara in bed with a skeleton. Consulting a Buddhist priest, Ogiwara finds that he is in danger unless he can resist the woman, and he places a protection charm on his house. The woman is then unable to enter his house, but calls him from outside. Finally, unable to resist, Ogiwara goes out to greet her, and is led back to her house, a grave in a temple. In the morning, Ogiwara's dead body is found entwined with the woman's skeleton.

version

Kabuki version
A young student named Saburo falls in love with a beautiful woman named Otsuyu, the daughter of his father's best friend. They meet secretly, and promise to be married. However, Saburo falls ill, and is unable to see Otsuyu for a long time.

Later, when Saburo recovers and goes to see his love, he is told that Otsuyu has died. He prays for her spirit during the  festival, and is surprised to hear the approaching footsteps of two women. When he sees them, they look remarkably like Otsuyu and her maid. It is revealed that her aunt, who opposed the marriage, spread the rumor that Otsuyu had died and told Otsuyu in turn that Saburo had died.

The two lovers, reunited, begin their relationship again in secret. Each night Otsuyu, accompanied by her maid who carries a peony lantern, spends the night with Saburo.

This continues blissfully until one night a servant peeks through a hole in the wall in Saburo's bedroom, and sees him having sex with a decaying skeleton, while another skeleton sits in the doorway holding a peony lantern. He reports this to the local Buddhist priest, who locates the graves of Otsuyu and her maid.  Taking Saburo there, he convinces him of the truth, and agrees to help Saburo guard his house against the spirits. The priest places  around the house, and prays the  every night.

The plan works, and Otsuyu and her maid are unable to enter, although they come every night and call out their love to Saburo. Pining for his sweetheart, Saburo's health begins to deteriorate. Otsuyu enters, and again has sex with Saburo.

In the morning, the servants find Saburo dead, his body entwined with Otsuyu's skeleton, with a blissful expression on his face.

Differences
The main differences between the two versions are the changing of the human lover from Ogiwara Shinnojo, an elderly widower, to Saburo, a young student, and the establishment of a pre-existing lover's relationship between Otsuyu and Saburo.

One of these influences was adding a romantic element to the story, something that was played down in older .

Influences and references
 establishes the theme of a sexual encounter with the ghost of a woman as a central aspect of the story, a theme which would later go on to influence a number of later . This theme follows the standard pattern of a Noh theater  play, where the female ghost hides her spectral nature until the final reveal at the end of the story.

The nature of the ghost's return to Earth is either a lingering love, or a general loneliness. The  version of  has no prior relationship, and Otsuyu merely wishes for a companion in the afterlife. The  and kabuki versions, however, have Otsuyu returning for a former lover.

The sexual ghost can be found in Kyōka Izumi's story  (A Quiet Obsession) which features a sensual encounter with a female ghost in an onsen.

 is famous for the onomatopoeia , which is the sound of Otsuyu's wooden clogs announcing her appearance on stage.

Film

 is one of the first Japanese ghost stories to be put to film, with a silent version in 1910. Six further adaptations were made between 1911 and 1937, although all of these have been lost to time and only the titles are still known.

Notable is Satsuo Yamamoto's 1968 version, filmed for Daiei Studios. It is variously known as Bride from Hell, Haunted Lantern, Ghost Beauty, My Bride is a Ghost, Bride from Hades, or Peony Lanterns. Yamamoto's film roughly follows the  version of the story, establishing protagonist Hagiwara Shinzaburo as a teacher who flees an unwanted marriage with his brother's widow and lives quietly some distance from his family. The usual encounter with Otsuyu follows, although the inevitable consequence is treated as a happy ending, or, at worst, bittersweet, since they are united beyond the grave, if not in life.

In 1972, director Chūsei Sone made a pink film version for Nikkatsu's Roman Porno series, entitled .

A massive change in the story is made in Masaru Tsushima's 1996 . This version has Shinzaburo dreaming of a past life, where he promised a double suicide with Otsuyu, but fails to kill himself after she dies. In his present life, he meets a girl named Tsuya who is the reincarnation of his past beloved, but Shinzaburo's father arranges a marriage for him with Tsuya's sister, Suzu. Shinzaburo's friend attempts to rape Tsuya, so that she would stop being a nuisance jealous of her younger sister. Devastated, the two sisters commit suicide together. The usual consequences follow, but the film ends with Shinzaburo and Otsuyu further reincarnated together, living happily in a future life.

See also
Bancho Sarayashiki
Japanese mythology
Japanese horror
Obake
Onryō

Notes

References
  Reider, Noriko T. "The Emergence of Kaidan-Shu: The Collection of Tales of the Strange and Mysterious in the Edo Period" Journal of Folklore Studies (60)1 pg. 79, 2001
  Reider, Noriko T. "The Appeal of Kaidan Tales of the Strange" Journal of Folklore Studies (59)2 pg. 265, 2000
 Iwasaka, Michiko, Ghosts and the Japanese: Cultural Experience in Japanese Death Legends, USA, Utah State University Press, pg. 111 1994, 
 
 Araki, James T., Traditional Japanese Theater: An Anthology of Plays, USA, Columbia University Press, 1998
 McRoy, Jay, Japanese Horror Cinema USA, University of Hawaii Press, pg. 22, 2005 
 
 Ross, Catrien, Supernatural and Mysterious Japan, Tokyo, Japan, Tuttle Publishing, 1996,

Further reading
Addiss, Steven, Japanese Ghosts and Demons, USA, George Braziller, Inc., 1986, 
Kincaid, Zoe, Kabuki, the Popular Stage of Japan, USA, Macmillan, 1925

External links
 Lafcadio Hearn's translation "A Passional Karma"
 Mudan Dengji (Peony Lantern) by Qu You, a translated by Jeremy Yang. A translation of original Chinese version
 The Peony Lantern

Kaidan Botan-dōrō trailer

1892 plays
Chinese ghosts
Chinese folklore
Japanese folklore
Japanese horror fiction
Kabuki
Fiction about necrophilia
Japanese ghosts
Japanese words and phrases